The Walter Bora was a Czechoslovakian nine-cylinder, air-cooled radial engine for powering light aircraft that was developed in the 1930s by Walter Aircraft Engines.

Variants
Bora II
Direct drive engine
Bora II-R
Geared engine, reduction ratio 0.666:1

Applications
Aero A.200
Nardi FN.305
RWD-9
SIAI-Marchetti SM.101

Engines on display
A preserved example of the Walter Bora engine is on display at the following museum:
Prague Aviation Museum, Kbely

Specifications (Bora II-R)

See also

References

Notes

Bibliography

 Gunston, Bill. World Encyclopedia of Aero Engines. Cambridge, England. Patrick Stephens Limited, 1989. 

1930s aircraft piston engines
Bora
Aircraft air-cooled radial piston engines